The CS/LS5 is a submachine gun developed by the Jianshe Industries (Group) Corporation of Chongqing. The CS/LS5 design is chambered for indigenous armour-piercing 9×19mm DAP-92 ammunition, but can also use the popular 9×19mm Parabellum round used internationally by armed forces and law enforcement for most pistols and sub machine guns, as well as domestically developed less lethal rubber ammunition.

Design and development
The CS/LS5 has a short-stroke gas piston system which operates in closed bolt. It comes with a 21.6 cm barrel chambered in 9×19mm Parabellum cartridge, with rear and front iron sights, accessory steel Picatinny rail mounts and a folding stock. It features a left-mounted selector switch for fully automatic (law enforcement/military models) and semi-automatic fire, with the charging handle at the upper front left of the weapon. The exterior of CS/LS5 somewhat resembles MP5 and FAMAE SAF, however these three weapons have completely different internal mechanism.

The standard weapon weighs overall  with loaded magazine. The weapon was an export-orientated project, and was never accepted into Chinese military and police force.

See also
 CS/LS06
 CS/LS7

References

External links

Submachine guns of the People's Republic of China
9mm Parabellum submachine guns
Police weapons